Janice Carson Beatley (March 18, 1919 – November 14, 1987) was an American botanist, known for her fieldwork on the forests of Ohio and the flora of the Nevada Atomic Test Site. Beatley was Professor of Biological Sciences at the University of Cincinnati. She has three plant species named in her honour including .

Early life and education 
Janice Carson Beatley was born in Columbus, Ohio to Earle Beatley and Alice Elizabeth (Carson) Beatley. In 1935, she graduated from North High School in Columbus, then went on to obtain three degrees from The Ohio State University, a B.A. in zoology (1940), and a M.S. (1948) and a PhD (1953), both in botany with research in plant ecology.

Career 
During her early career, Beatley conducted extensive studies of the forests of central and southern Ohio, including a survey of more than 1000 species of wintergreen herbaceous flora. This work, published as "The winter-green herbaceous flowering plants of Ohio" (1956), is believed to be the first comprehensive study of its kind in North America. Other extensive studies of Ohio vegetation followed, but in 1960, Beatley's focus shifted to the Atomic Test Site of south-central Nevada, where she would work for the next 13 years. Her studies there included identification and mapping of native and non-native plant species, as well as the effects of environmental factors, such as precipitation and radioactive dust, on the local flora. Later, she would return to Ohio, but continue her research in Nevada. Over the course of her career, Beatley undertook academic and research positions for several institutions, including: University of Tennessee, East Carolina College, North Carolina State University and New Mexico Highlands University. Over the course of her career, she collected over 10,000 herbarium specimens, which are deposited in herbarium collections across the US.

From 1960 to 1973 she was a research ecologist at the University of California, Los Angeles and the Nevada Test Site at Mercury, Nevada. She moved on to become a professor of Biological Sciences at the University of Cincinnati from 1973 to 1987. She was also a research associate at the Herbarium of the Ohio State University (1983-1987).

Her work at the Nevada test site began in 1962 when she created 68 study sites. The intention had been to study the effect of radiation on the plants, but this plan had to be changed when the United States abandoned atmospheric testing of nuclear weapons in 1963. The sites however became important because they recorded change. She published reports up to 1980 but much of her data was never published but it was all transferred to the USGS after she died. It was "an ideal place to conduct long-term ecosystem research".

Beatley was a member of many professional scientific bodies, as well as an active supporter of several environmental protection organizations. Three plant species are named for her: Astragalus beatleyae Barneby, Eriogonum beatleyae Reveal, and Phacelia beatleyae Reveal and Constance. Beatley died of pneumonia on November 14, 1987. In the years following, the Janice Carson Beatley Herbarium Fund was created in her honor at The Ohio State University.

Publications 
A selection of the most widely held works by Beatley:

Beatley also conducted research on the sunflowers of Tennessee and the buckeyes of Ohio, among others.

Standard author abbreviation

References 

1919 births
1987 deaths
American botanists
Botanists with author abbreviations
Ohio State University College of Arts and Sciences alumni
University of Cincinnati faculty